Gog is a fictional supervillain appearing in American comic books published by Marvel Comics. The character has appeared in The Amazing Spider-Man and X-Men.

Publication history
Created by writer Roy Thomas and Gil Kane, the character first appears in The Amazing Spider-Man #103.

Fictional character biography
While traveling through the Savage Land, Kraven the Hunter finds a crashed spaceship in quicksand and ventures inside. There, he finds the juvenile Gog and another member of his species, who died during the crash landing of the spaceship. Deciding to save the young Gog from his sinking ship, Kraven takes him with him and decides to raise him as a pet; much to Kraven's surprise, Gog rapidly grows to a gigantic size only days after being found. Kraven, realizing how useful Gog can be, decides to use him in a plot to conquer the Savage Land. After kidnapping the visiting Gwen Stacy from a camp in the Savage Land, Kraven and Gog battle the heroes Ka-Zar and Spider-Man. While Ka-Zar deals with Kraven, Spider-Man defeats Gog by luring him into a patch of quicksand, which he then sinks to the bottom of.

Gog would later be saved from dying in the quicksand by the Plunderer. Having Gog (who created a device that allowed him to speak English) act as his servant, the Plunderer uses him in a plot to try to steal the super-soldier serum in New York City. Followed to New York by Ka-Zar, Gog and the Plunderer battle him before Gog, using his teleportation bracelets, escapes, first to the Statue of Liberty, then the World Trade Center and finally, to another dimension.

Gog is later found by Doctor Octopus and the Sinister Six, who induct the creature into their group as the sixth and final member. Whilst engaged in battle with several heroes, Gog is beaten in combat by the hero Solo and shrunken by Mister Fantastic, who sends him back to the dimension the Sinister Six found him in.

Gog later appeared on Monster Isle when Shadowcat and Magik appeared to look for a mutant girl named Bo. Gog was among the monsters that attacked the three until Magik teleported herself, Shadowcat, and Bo to the Jean Grey School for Higher Learning.

Gog reappeared in The Amazing Spider-Man with underwriter Nick Spencer detailing his new origin as an alien pet and voyage to Earth as Kraven's bodyguard.

Powers and abilities
Gog possesses superhuman strength. He also wears bracelets that are capable of granting him interdimensional teleportation.

In film
In 2014, Sony Pictures were in progress of developing a spin-off film to the 2012 film The Amazing Spider-Man featuring the Sinister Six, with Drew Goddard attached to write and direct. Due to the hacking of Sony's database in 2014 and massive confidential leaks, information regarding the Sinister Six revealed Gog was considered to appear in the movie in an early draft of the script.

References

External links
 Gog at Marvel.com
 Gog at Marvel Wiki
 Gog at Comic Vine

Comics characters introduced in 1971
Fictional mass murderers
Marvel Comics extraterrestrial supervillains
Marvel Comics characters who can teleport
Marvel Comics characters with superhuman strength
Marvel Comics male supervillains
Fictional monsters
Spider-Man characters
Characters created by Roy Thomas
Characters created by Gil Kane